The Eyes of Heisenberg is a 1966 science fiction novel by American writer Frank Herbert. Originally serialized as Heisenberg's Eyes in Galaxy magazine between June and August 1966, it was issued by Berkley in the same year. The title refers to Werner Heisenberg's uncertainty principle, here applied both on the molecular (genetic) level (producing the atypical embryo the story hinges on) and on a macroscopic, societal level.

Setting
The short novel takes places in an initially unspecified future in which society is rigidly stratified into two genetic and reproductive classes: the "Optimen" (who include women) and the "Folk." All humans are mandatorily genetically reviewed and modified ("cut") just after conception by surgeons answering to the Optimen, a ruling class of genetically superior humans.

The Optimen are distinguished by genetic excellence, but also by a unique vocation; their metabolisms are such that treatment with the life-extension enzymes available to most members of the society instead induces true biological immortality. The Optimen exercise absolute dictatorial control over Earth from an enclave in North America. They hold global society in stasis, both politically and through continuous manipulation of the human genome. Only a small minority of the population is permitted to reproduce, and that only under strict supervision—the vast majority of the Folk are "Sterries," kept sterile through an ever-present prophylactic gas. The Optimen are naturally sterile.

The Folk revere the Optimen with a quasi-religious fervor, centered on the mantra "They are the power that loves us and protects us." The adulation is however not universal; an anti-Optiman resistance exists, in the form of the "Parents Underground" and the "Couriers," both networks sponsored by the Cyborgs, mechanically enhanced humans long opposed to the immortals.

As the story unfolds, the setting—which had seemed a relatively near future, perhaps a few centuries at most—is revealed to be at least 80,000 years distant (the age given for the oldest Optimen). The extraordinary control of the Optimen is such that late 21st century life has been the norm for millennia.

It is noted that the Optimen have deliberately stunted technological progress. The Cyborgs are implied to be rather long-lived themselves—an Optiman-Cyborg War is briefly mentioned, and it is implied as having taken place in the quite distant past, but it is elsewhere stated that this was no more than three Cyborg generations ago.

Most of the book takes place in the "Seatac Megalopolis"—apparently incorporating present-day Seattle and Tacoma—and the Optiman enclave.

Major characters

 Harvey and Lizbeth Durant - protagonists, "viables" (parents), Courier dissidents
 Dr. Vyaslav Potter - a surgeon, performs the "cut" on Harvey and Lizbeth's embryo, refuses to destroy it
 Dr. Thei Svengaard - a lower-ranking surgeon. Shanghaied by the resistance after becoming suspicious
 Glisson - a high-ranking Cyborg
 The Tuyere - the ruling triumvirate of the Optimen, elected for a century. Comprises the Optimen Calapine, Nourse and Schruille
 Dr. Boumard and Dr. Igan - high-ranking surgeons in the service of the Optimen
 Max Allgood - the Tuyere's Chief of Tachy-Security. A succession of clones, replaced at 400-year intervals

Plot
Chs. 1–4: Harvey and Lizbeth Durant arrive to witness the cutting of their embryo. Svengaard, a low-ranking doctor, tries to convince them to skip the procedure, but they are adamant and insist on their right, all the while secretly communicating their contempt for Svengaard in a silent Courier code. Potter, a high-ranking surgeon, arrives to perform the cut. During the procedure, he is shocked to discover that the embryo has qualities not seen in millennia; superior genetics in the areas of intelligence, plus vocation for immortality and full fertility. Obligated to destroy it, Potter is surprised to find himself unwilling to do so, aided by the on-the-spot collusion of one of the nurses who sabotages the record of the operation.

Ch. 5: Max Allgood, Boumard and Igan arrive at the Hall of Counsel for an audience with the Tuyere. Tachy-Security monitoring has detected something amiss with the Durant embryo cutting. The nurse has been arrested, but has died under interrogation. The Optimen Calapine, Nourse and Schruille playfully mock their subordinates, always with a faint undercurrent of menace. Calapine flirts with Allgood in a semi-bemused fashion. The Tuyere order that Svengaard be brought before them. Boumard and Igan are revealed to the reader as Cyborg agents.

Ch. 6: Svengaard is interrogated by the Tuyere. Badly frightened, he fumbles and grows agitated under their mockery, becoming insubordinate. The Tuyere calm him down by a display of magnanimity, reminding him of their power, wisdom and seniority.

Ch. 7: In a service area under the Seatac Megalopolis, the Durants have gone into hiding. They meet with the Cyborg Glisson, who informs them of events, tells them that a strange external force had (beneficially) interfered with the cutting process of their embryo, and orders them to stay put. The Durants chafe under its unfeeling, domineering manner, hoping to one another to one day be free of the Optimen and Cyborgs. They scheme to deliver their baby the unheard-of natural way, and keep it out of reach of both. They wonder if the interfering power is God.

Ch. 8-9: Svengaard detects activity in the hospital vat room, where the embryo is kept. Investigating, he is rendered unconscious and abducted from under the nose of Max Allgood's surveillance.

Ch. 10-11: Potter is escorted through the streets of Seatac by a resistance agent. Near their destination, they are intercepted by security forces. Potter's escort sends him ahead, revealing himself as a combat cyborg and decimating the pursuers until it is destroyed. Potter is spirited away by the resistance. The Tuyere - and many other Optimen - watch the battle live, the long-unfamiliar thrill of violence awakening odd sensations in them.

Ch. 12: In a resistance safehouse, Igan tries to recruit a recalcitrant Svengaard. Failing, they sedate him and make plans to evacuate Seatac, which they suspect the Optimen are about to genocidally purge of all life.

Ch. 13: The Durants, Boumard and Igan (their cover blown) and a gagged Svengaard are moved out of Seatac in a hover-truck driven by a Cyborg, later revealed to be Glisson. At a checkpoint, Svengaard cries out briefly, causing them to be traced. Glisson changes their destination.

Ch. 14: The Tuyere wipe out Seatac through a combination of poison gas and sonic weapons. They find themselves surprised by their unstable emotional reactions to the event.

Ch. 15: The occupants of the truck observe the destruction of Seatac; Svengaard's faith in the Optimen is badly shaken. The Durants notice that Boumard and Igan are in the early stages of cyborgization. The truck proceeds to a ramshackle safehouse in the forest.

Ch. 16: The Tuyere receives a field report from Max Allgood. Calapine, growing suspicious of his behavior, scans him with her instruments, discovering that he has accepted Cyborg implants. Enraged, she kills him remotely. Calapine and Schruille decide to run Tachy-Security themselves, finding themselves oddly stimulated by the prospect of an even more active involvement in violence. Potter is revealed to have died offstage in Seatac. Calapine and Nourse both require treatment for enzyme imbalance.

Ch. 17: The occupants of the cabin decide that the apathetic Svengaard cannot be trusted, and should be killed. Harvey asks him if he wants to live; Svengaard suddenly finds that he does. He offers to care for the Durant's child, an offer Harvey accepts as he does not trust the cyborgs Boumard and Igan. The security forces of the Optimen surround the house and disarm (literally) Glisson.

Ch. 18: The Tuyere debate what to do with the prisoners. They speculate that, if the infection of viability spreads, wiping out all the Folk and starting over is not out of the question. They decide to have the prisoners brought to themselves for interrogation.

Ch. 19: A full assembly of Optimen meet in the Hall of Counsel. The prisoners are brought in, immobilized in a solid block. The Optimen begin to feel odd emotions, spiraling into greater and greater instability. Glisson asserts that reintroducing them to firsthand violence was a Cyborg ploy to destabilize the delicate equilibrium of the Optiman mind, and that the Cyborgs have won. A semi-hysterical Calapine converses with the prisoners, verging on killing them, but abruptly releases them instead. The Optimen descend into insanity; several, including Schruille, are killed in a stampede. The former prisoners try to help.

Ch. 20: Calapine and the former prisoners discuss the new status quo. Glisson's gloating is cut off when a biological solution is proposed. Svengaard thinks that he will be able to stabilize the Optimen, and introduce the beneficial mutations of the Durant embryo on a wide scale, giving the Folk a lifespan of at least 12,000 to 15,000 years—longevity without the pernicious ossification of immortality. The novel concludes on a note of guarded optimism.

Themes

Continuing a theme present in many of Herbert's other works, the novel is principally concerned with the problems inherent in or caused by the inflexibility of a static system. The Durants find themselves a cog in the high-level machinations of competing factions, none of which have their own best interests at heart.

A number of Herbert's other common themes pop up, including his interest in complex, rigidly codified or ritualized behaviors, reflected in the precise etiquette expected of those granted an audience with the Tuyere. Herbert's interest in exotic forms of communication takes the shape of the secret language of the Couriers, conveyed through subtle palm pressures during handholding. The longevity of the Optimen prefigures Leto II of the Dune saga.

Reception
David Pringle rated The Eyes of Heisenberg two stars out of four. Pringle described the book as "a provocative novel of ideas written in this author's usual style".

See also
Battle Angel Alita
Elysium (film)

References

External links 
 
 
 Heisenberg's Eyes as serialized in Galaxy, parts one and two, at the Internet Archive

1966 American novels
Novels by Frank Herbert
American science fiction novels
Novels first published in serial form
Works originally published in Galaxy Science Fiction
Berkley Books books